Murilo may refer to:

Mononym
Murilo (footballer, born 1984), Murilo Bedusco dos Santos, Brazilian right back
Murilo (footballer, born March 1995), Murilo Otávio Mendes, Brazilian forward
Murilo (footballer, born December 1995), Murilo Henrique de Araujo Santos, Brazilian left back
Murilo (footballer, born 1996), Murilo Oliveira de Freitas, Brazilian left winger

Given name
Murilo Becker (born 1983), Brazilian basketball player
Murilo Benício (born 1971), Brazilian actor
Murilo Bustamante (born 1966), Brazilian martial artist
Murilo Costa (born 1994), Brazilian football player
Murilo de Almeida (born 1989), Brazilian football player
Murilo Endres (born 1981), Brazilian volleyball player
Murilo Fischer (born 1979), road bicycle racer
Murilo Gouvea (born 1988), Brazilian baseball player
Murilo Otávio Mendes (born 1995), Brazilian football player
Murilo Rosa (born 1970), Brazilian actor
Murilo Rua (born 1980), Brazilian martial artist

Other uses
Murilo, Federated States of Micronesia, a village, atoll, and municipality

See also 
Murillo (disambiguation)

Masculine given names